Finger is the surname of:

 Alan Finger (1909-1985), Australian medical practitioner and communist
 Bill Finger (1914–1974), American comic strip writer, co-creator of the Batman character
 Gottfried Finger (c. 1660–1730), Moravian Baroque composer and viol player
 Harold Finger (born 1924), American aeronautical engineer
 Herman Finger (1856-1929), American-Canadian businessman
 Jeff Finger (born 1979), American hockey player
 Joseph Finger (1887–1953), Austrian-born American architect
 Peter Finger (born 1954), German guitarist, songwriter, and record producer
 Susan Finger, American engineer